Israel Hadany (Israel ha-Dani) (born 1941) is an Israeli environment artist , sculptor and jewelry designer, internationally acknowledged. He is involved with poetry writing as well.

Biography

Early life 
Born in Beit HaShita kibutz. Along his childhood his family moved several times, first to Ayelet Hashahar kibutz, later to Kfar Ganim  (nearby Petah Tikva) and finally to Jerusalem.

In 1955, at the age of 14, he departed from his family and joined alone to kibutz Degania.

Artistic studies and career 
1956-1957 At the age of 15 he started his art studies at the Avni Institute in Tel Aviv, taking evening courses while continuing his high school learning during day time. He was the youngest student in the institute among other mature students. He focused on drawing and painting studies and was deeply involved in his art. Later he returned there but soon realized that painting is not going to be enough for his artistic and personal aspirations.

1965 - 1967 He turned to post graduate studies at Hornsey College of Art, London.

The years in London influenced deeply his art.  His confrontation with monumental ancient civilization's art in the British Museum was highly influential and left a significant imprint on his art. He mentions often a monumental sculpture from the Easter Islands . In Hornsey College he focused mainly on sculpture.

Several years after his return to Israel (1971) he was invited to teach sculpture and design at Bezalel Academy of Art and Design.

1972 Hadany Represented Israel at the in hadany "Venice Biennale", Italy.

After this year he did not return to teaching.

Hadany often collaborates in his art with architects and thinkers and creates environmental works of art.

1975  He works with Taller de Arquitectura of Ricardo Bofill. Barcelona .

1981-1982  creates the first artonomic system in sculpture.

1983 Represents Israel at the International Symposium on Outdoor Sculpture at Yorkshire.

2000 Among the five finalists in the international competition of Martin Luther King National Memorial Project Washington.

2001 Guest artist at the International Sculpture Symposium, Carrara.

2005 Awarded an honorary doctoral degree by Monmouth University, New Jersey.

Selected Public Works 
1973 Sculpture, Eshkol Park , Dimona.

1975 Glass Sculpture, Beit Yad Lebanim, Jerusalem.

1977 Memorial Sculpture , Ben Gurion Airport .

1978 Hadany Arch, road sculpture . Williamsport , Pennsylvenia.

1984 Arthur Rubinstein Memorial Sculpture. Aminadav Forest. Israel

1985 Sky Pool , The Open Museum ,Tefen , Israel.

1987 Sky Pool , The Israel Museum Sculpture Garden.

1988 Light Tower, Virginia Center for the Creative Arts, Sweet Briar, Virginia.

1990  Gate to Peace, Ben Gurion University, Beersheba, Israel.

1992 Environmental Sculpture, Mitzpe Ramon, Israel.

2005 Oasis, Environmental Sculpture, Northern entrance BeerSheba.

You Who Bear Memories of All Times. outdoor sculpture, Prague

1998 Daniel in the Lions' Den. the Open Museum, Tefen.

1998 The Shrine of Trees , the National Library , Hebrew University , Jerusalem.

2001 Here lays the dove's shadow.Carrara.

2016 The Blue System . Har Hotzvim Jerusalem

Hadany's art is concerned with the sublime and the transcendental often allusive of ancient monumental Egyptian and Assyrian art .Most of his earlier three dimensional  works were geometrical and minimalistic. but after his visit to  India in 2005 his art has undergone a deep change and was opened to new directions. Oasis, his artistic environment in Beersheba for instance is colourful and rich in shapes.

Selected individual shows 
2004 " Visual Memories" The Open Museum Tefen.  Israel.

Selected grants and awards 
1970 Kolliner Prize for young artist . Israel Museum.

1974 First prize for design of memorial site of Paula and David Ben Gurion in Sde Boker

Sharet  grant for further studies in Europe

1978 First prize for design of Mediterranean art center Theoulone  Sur mer in southern France.

1980 The  Jerusalem Prize of art.

2000 Among the finalists on the contest for Martin Luther King Memorial

2012 Dan Sendel Prize by Tel Aviv Museum of art.

References

Sources
Meir Ronen, The building blocks , The Jerusalem Post  5/7/1985 
Meir Ronen, Jewelry of Sculpture, The Jerusalem Post 3/3/1989
Miriam Yizrael "שמים בקרקעית העולם פסלי ישראל הדני" 
"Sky in the bottom of the world" , Studio, October 1990
Gilad Meltzer, "Like an Archeologic site" Yediot Ahronot 12/3/2004
 Israel Hadany "In Search of the Sacred" (exhibition catalogue. article by Gideon Ofrat)

1941 births
Living people
Israeli sculptors